= Adomas Ąžuolas Audickas =

Lithuanian economist, business consultant and politician

Adomas Ąžuolas Audickas (born in 1982 in Lithuania) is a Lithuanian business consultant.

== Biography ==
Adomas obtained a Bachelor degree in Mathematics from Vilnius University (Lithuania) in 2005.

In 2011, he was appointed as a Member of the Supervisory Board in UAB VAE (Lithuania) and also, he served there as a Chairman of the Supervisory Board. From 2013 to 2015, he was a Partner at a Baltics leading consulting company UAB Civitta.

In 2015-2016, Adomas was a Senior Advisor to the Minister of Economy of Ukraine (2015-2016). In 2017, he has become the President of Ukrainian Academy of Corporate Governance. Also, since 2017, Adomas has served as Advisor to the Prime Minister of Ukraine. In 2018, he has become a Member of the Supervisory Board of JSC Mahistralni Gazoprovody of Ukraine. Since 2019, he has become a Member of the Supervisory Board of JSC Ukrzaliznytsia.
